Mastigas or Mastinas ruled the Mauro-Roman Kingdom during the sixth century as King of the Moors and Romans, succeeding Masuna. During the reign of Mastigas, the Mauro-Roman Kingdom governed almost the entire ancient Roman province of Mauretania Caesariensis, except for the former capital of Caesarea which was held by the Eastern Roman Empire.

Mastigas would ally with Iaudas, ruler of the Kingdom of the Aurès and an enemy of both the Eastern Roman Empire and the previous Mauro-Roman king, Masuna, in an attempt at capturing territory from other smaller Berber kingdoms in the region. Unlike Iaudas and his kingdom, the realm of Mastigas would not face any Eastern Roman attacks, possibly due to its more distant location, and would later on provide a safe haven for surviving defeated Berber forces and rebel Romans.

Reign 
Mastigas ruled the Berbers of Mauretania Caesariensis in the late 530s, succeeding Masuna. The Eastern Roman historian Procopius is the only source on him, briefly mentioning Mastigas and other local Berber rulers in Book II of the De Bello Vandalico. Mastigas was identified as an independent ruler with control of much of the former Roman province except for the former capital, Caesarea, which had been in Vandal possession and later reconquered by the Eastern Roman Empire under the famous general Belisarius in 533 AD.

Southern Numidia, known as the Kingdom of the Aurès, was ruled by King Iaduas, an enemy of the Eastern Roman Empire and of the previous Mauro-Roman King Masuna, and large parts of the former province of Mauretania Sitifensis was under the rule of King Ortaias, who had been an ally of Masuna. Mastigas allied with Iaudas in an attempt at capturing territory held by Ortaias. Iaudas would be defeated by the Eastern Roman Empire, but Mauretania would not see any Eastern Roman attacks, perhaps due to it being located further away from the African capital of Carthage. Perhaps due to its further off location, the Mauro-Roman Kingdom would act as a safe haven for surviving defeated Berber warriors and even rebel Romans, such as for the African rebel Stotzas and his followers. Stotzas married the daughter of a local noble (perhaps the daughter of Mastigas or Masuna) and was allegedly named as King in 541 AD, potentially succeeding Mastigas as King of the Moors and Romans.

Mastigas struck coins bearing his own monogram as well as the portrait of the Eastern Roman Emperor, at this time Justinian I, much like the rulers of other Barbarian kingdoms.

References

Citations

Bibliography 
 
 

6th-century monarchs in Africa
Mauretania Caesariensis
Berber rulers
6th-century Berber people
Mauro-Roman Kingdom
Monarchs of the Mauro-Roman Kingdom